is a Japanese sprinter. She competed in the women's 200 metres at the 1964 Summer Olympics.

References

1946 births
Living people
Athletes (track and field) at the 1964 Summer Olympics
Japanese female sprinters
Olympic athletes of Japan
Place of birth missing (living people)
Olympic female sprinters